Thomas Jackie Baures (born 12 January 1998) is a French badminton player. Baures was part of the France team who won the mixed team competition at the 2017 European Junior Badminton Championships.

Achievements

BWF International Challenge/Series (2 runners-up)
Men's doubles

BWF Junior Tournament (1 title, 2 runners-up) 
Boys' doubles

Mixed doubles

  BWF International Challenge tournament
  BWF International Series tournament
  BWF Future Series tournament

References

External links 
 

1998 births
Living people
Sportspeople from Nancy, France
French male badminton players
21st-century French people